Centrists of Catalonia (CC–UCD) was a Catalan-based electoral alliance formed in June 1978 ahead of the upcoming local and general elections, comprising the Catalan section of the Union of the Democratic Centre (UCD), the Union of the Centre of Catalonia (UCC) and the Democratic Union–Broad Centre (UDCA). The alliance was maintained after the election, with UCD and UDCA agreeing to transform it into a full-fledged political party in December 1979 with the disagreement of the UCC, which chose not to join the new party. At its foundation congress held on 22 December 1979, Antón Cañellas was elected as new party president.

History

Origins and establishment
Centrists of Catalonia had its roots in the relative success achieved by Prime Minister Adolfo Suárez-supported Union of the Democratic Centre (UDC)'s lists in Catalonia in the 1977 Spanish general election, despite having been hastily made within 48 hours and comprised only independent candidates after nullifying a previously-signed alliance between the People's Party of Catalonia and the Social Democratic Party of Catalonia. These had garnered the support of 16.9% of Catalan voters, finishing in third place ahead of other alliances appealing to the centre Catalan ground such as the Democratic Pact for Catalonia—which included Democratic Convergence of Catalonia (CDC) and Democratic Left of Catalonia (EDC) as the alliance's main promoters—and the Union of the Centre and Christian Democracy of Catalonia—which comprised the Democratic Union of Catalonia (UDC) and the Catalan Centre (CC).

The UCD's electoral strength relative to other centrist parties and the influence it had as the party in the government of Spain seduced various political actors, giving way to movements seeking the establishment of closer ties with the party in Catalonia. On the one hand, the Catalan Centre started negotiations with the UCD Catalan branch and other political parties throughout the second half of 1977, leading to the establishment of the Union of the Centre of Catalonia (UCC) in March 1978, with which the UCD would first sign an electoral agreement for the local elections, then establish a common platform in June that year—often referred to as a "liaison political committee"—to oversee a future merger between both parties. This course of action was initially met with skepticism within several UCD sectors, with some remaining reluctant of negotiating under equal conditions with political groups failing to garner any electoral successes, and some others—such as Adolfo Suárez himself—being weary of consenting to a breakdown of the UCD's organic unity in order to create an autonomous party in Catalonia.

On the other hand, the internal crisis within the Democratic Union of Catalonia resulting from its poor election results, coupled with its quest for a strong electoral ally, divided the party among those favouring a rapprochement to the CDC–EDC bloc and those advocating for a merger with the UCD to form a large Catalan-based centrist platform. This would see two party splits: the first one in September 1977, with the creation of the Union of the Christian Democrats of Catalonia–Jacques Maritain Club which would become one of the constituent parties of the UCC; then, the Democratic Union–Broad Centre (UDCA) of Antón Cañellas would follow in November 1978. Cañellas and the UDCA engaged in talks with the UCD–UCC platform, leading to the establishment of the "Centrists of Catalonia" alliance on 24 November 1978.

Transformation into a party
The newly-formed alliance would contest the 1979 general and local elections—seeing a moderate success in the former and more discreet results in the latter—with its ultimate goal being to negotiate the full merger of its constituent parties into the UCD to grant it "full Catalanist and democratic credibility", as well as advancing towards their common goal of establishing a "broad centre" space. In October 1979, the UCD leadership would authorize the establishment of Centrists of Catalonia as an autonomous party linked to its national counterpart, with a congress scheduled to be held in December—ahead of the regional election scheduled for early 1980—to oversee the merger of the Catalan UCD, the UCC and UDCA into the new party. This move sparked divisions within the regional UCD between two sectors: the "autonomists"—in defense of greater autonomy and provincialization of the new party—and the "centralists"—advocating instead for a presidencialist structure that was to be subordinated to the UCD's national leadership.

Another issue was the composition of the future party's executive committee, with UCC and UDCA pushing for a greater presence and warning of their willingness in engage in talks with CDC instead in the event of not achieving their proposed party model. These conflicts would result in a UCD sector led by Juan José Folchi and in UCC not attending the merger congress in Girona, with the latter ultimately choosing not to continue with the merger process. UDCA leader Antón Cañellas would be elected as the party's first president.

Composition

Electoral performance

Parliament of Catalonia

Cortes Generales

Notes

References

1979 establishments in Catalonia
1983 disestablishments in Catalonia
Defunct political party alliances in Spain
Defunct political parties in Catalonia
Political parties established in 1979
Political parties disestablished in 1983